Przyborów may refer to the following places in Poland:
Przyborów, Lower Silesian Voivodeship (south-west Poland)
Przyborów, Łask County in Łódź Voivodeship (central Poland)
Przyborów, Radomsko County in Łódź Voivodeship (central Poland)
Przyborów, Lesser Poland Voivodeship (south Poland)
Przyborów, Subcarpathian Voivodeship (south-east Poland)
Przyborów, Świętokrzyskie Voivodeship (south-central Poland)
Przyborów, Greater Poland Voivodeship (west-central Poland)
Przyborów, Silesian Voivodeship (south Poland)
Przyborów, Nowa Sól County in Lubusz Voivodeship (west Poland)
Przyborów, Sulęcin County in Lubusz Voivodeship (west Poland)